The 2017 Spanish motorcycle Grand Prix was the fourth round of the 2017 MotoGP season. It was held at the Circuito de Jerez in Jerez de la Frontera on May 7, 2017. The MotoGP race also marked the 3,000th Grand Prix World Championship race.

Classification

MotoGP

Moto2

Moto3

 Philipp Öttl suffered a broken collarbone in a crash during qualifying and withdrew from the event.

Championship standings after the race

MotoGP
Below are the standings for the top five riders and constructors after round four has concluded.

Riders' Championship standings

Constructors' Championship standings

 Note: Only the top five positions are included for both sets of standings.

Moto2

Moto3

References

Spain
Motorcycle Grand Prix
Spanish motorcycle Grand Prix
Spanish